A Little Curious is an American children's animated television series that ran on HBO Family for two seasons. The series premiered on February 1, 1999 until its final episode aired on May 1, 2000. The series, produced by Curious Pictures and HBO, was aimed at preschoolers. It was one of the cornerstone programs for the relaunch of the HBO Family channel in February 1999.

Plot
The 24-minute episodes are essentially anthologies of shorts centered on a common, easily digested topic word such as "slippery" or "sticky". While each short draws from the same pool of characters, they are produced in a variety of animation techniques. Animation styles include stop-motion, clay animation, traditional 3-D and 2-D cel animation, and 3-D CGI, along with live-action segments mostly narrated by Bob the Ball. Some of the shorts are designed to fit more than one topic, and are re-used in different episodes.

Characters
The pool of characters, generally based on everyday objects, include:

Bob the Ball – a cute, friendly, boisterous, exuberant bouncing red rubber ball.
Gender: Male
Voiced by: Cameron Bowen
Little Cup – a sweetened, innocent glass cup of fruit punch who spends a lot of time learning about the world around him. He is Bob's best friend.
Gender: Male
Voiced by: Bob Kaliban
Mr. String – a nervous, intelligent, fussy bit of blue string who can twist and tie himself into a multitude of shapes. He frequently says "definitely".
Gender: Male
Voiced by: Gary Yudman
Plush – a multicolored, air-headed stuffed plush dog who is another one of Bob's best friends. Unlike the others, he mostly speaks in a strange giggly language.
Gender: Male
Voiced by: Bob Kaliban
Mop – a rock music-loving yellow mop with turquoise hair who frequently changes her hairstyle. She is Mr. String's best friend.
Gender: Female
Voiced by: Amanda Kaplan
Doris the Door – a pink and orange, Brooklyn-accented, two-faced automatic door, who, while being playful, is easily tired. Doris usually talks about her distant childhood. 
Gender: Female
Voiced by: Marilyn Pasekoff
Pad and Pencil – a presumably romantic drawing pad and pencil couple who constantly flatter each other through French accents.
Gender: Female (Pad), Male (Pencil)
Voiced by: Gerrianne Raphael (Pad), Rafael Ferrer (Pencil)
The Shoe Family – a family of pairs of shoes with footwear-themed names such as "Mary Jane". The parents are Mr. Shoe (brown dress shoes) and Mrs. Shoe (red high heels), and the children are Lacey (sneakers) and Mary Jane (a pair of Mary Janes). In "A Little Curious About Life", they had a baby brother named Booties. Mary Jane and Lacey are two of Bob's best friends.
Gender: Male (Mr. Shoe), Female (Mrs. Shoe, Lacey and Mary Jane)
Voiced by: Gary Yudman (Mr. Shoe), Sandy Correia (Mrs. Shoe and Lacey), Amanda Kaplan (Mary Jane)

Episodes

Season 1 (1993-1994)
Loud (December 21, 1993)
Far (December 28, 1993)
Mirror (January 7, 1994)
Above (January 14, 1994)
Back (January 21, 1994)
Shake (January 28, 1994)
Bubble (February 7, 1994)
Picture (February 14, 1994)
Ring (February 21, 1994)
Bubble 2 (February 28, 1994)
Twist (March 7, 1994)
Step (March 14, 1994)
Ring 2 (March 21, 1994)
Pop (March 28, 1994)
Different (April 7, 1994)
Spin (April 14, 1994)
Roll (April 21, 1994)
Bob the Ball (April 28, 1994)
Pop 2 (May 7, 1994)
Heart (May 14, 1994)
Plush (May 21, 1994)
Train (May 28, 1994)
Fall (June 7, 1994)
Low (July 14, 1994)
Side (July 21, 1994)

Season 2 (1996-1997)
Bottom (October 21, 1996)
Balance (October 28, 1996)
Flat (November 7, 1996)
Squeeze (November 14, 1996)
Miss (November 21, 1996)
Skip (November 28, 1996)
Hard (December 7, 1996)
Dance (December 14, 1996)
Act (December 21, 1996)
Tie (December 28, 1996)
Rock (January 7, 1997)
Life (January 14, 1997)
Jump (January 21, 1997)
Bump (January 28, 1997)
Mop (February 7, 1997)
Rock 2 (February 14, 1997)
Top (February 21, 1997)
Loose (February 28, 1997)

References

External links
A Little Curious at HBO Family (Archive)
 

1990s American animated television series
2000s American animated television series
1990s American anthology television series
2000s American anthology television series
1999 American television series debuts
2000 American television series endings
American children's animated anthology television series
American children's animated comedy television series
American computer-animated television series
American preschool education television series
American stop-motion animated television series
American television series with live action and animation
Animated preschool education television series
1990s preschool education television series
2000s preschool education television series
English-language television shows
HBO original programming
Television series by Curious Pictures
Television series by Home Box Office